Hilton Inlet is an ice-filled inlet,  wide, which recedes about  west from its entrance between Cape Darlington and Cape Knowles, along the east coast of Palmer Land, Antarctica. It was discovered by the United States Antarctic Service in 1940, and named for Donald C. Hilton, a member of the East Base sledge party that charted this coast as far south as this inlet.

References

Inlets of Palmer Land